Pantomallus morosus is a species of beetle in the family Cerambycidae. It was described by Audinet-Serville in 1834.

References

Eburiini
Beetles described in 1834